is a tram station located in Toshima, Tokyo, Japan. It opened on August 20, 1911.

Lines 
This stop is served by the Toden Arakawa Line operated by Tokyo Metropolitan Bureau of Transportation (Toei).

Adjacent stations

External links
 Ōtsuka-ekimae Station 

Railway stations in Japan opened in 1911
Railway stations in Tokyo
Buildings and structures in Toshima